Federal Sentencing Reporter is a law journal published five times annually by University of California Press, in Berkeley, California for the Vera Institute of Justice. Along with the presentation of new ideas and viewpoints on existing legislation and sentencing guidelines, the journal examines questions of sentencing policy and the practical application of modern sentencing reforms. The journal was established in 1988 and the managing editors are Douglas Berman (Ohio State University), and Steve Chanenson (Villanova University School of Law).

External links
 

American law journals
Criminal law journals
University of California Press academic journals
5 times per year journals